Two ships of the Royal Navy have borne the name HMS Fama:

  was a 36-gun fifth rate.
  was an 18-gun brig-sloop captured from the Danes in 1808 and wrecked in December.

See also

Citations

Royal Navy ship names